Hamzah bin Abu Samah (5 January 1924 – 4 September 2012) was a Malaysian politician, lawyer and sports administrator who served as the president of Asian Football Confederation from 9 December 1978 to 1 August 1994. In 2006, he was conferred the FIFA Order of Merit for his contribution towards Asian football. He also one of the fourth Malaysian to join the exclusive club of AFC Diamond of Asia Award with Dato' Seri Najib Tun Razak, Sultan Ahmad Shah and Sultan Abdullah.

Biography
Hamzah was educated at Malay College Kuala Kangsar.  He went on to study law at Gray's Inn in England.  He became a Member of Parliament representing Raub (1967–1978) and Temerloh (1978–1980) in Dewan Rakyat, Malaysia's parliament.

Additionally he was Minister of Sports and Youth from 22 April 1971 to 1 May 1973 in the Cabinet of Prime Minister Tun Abdul Razak. He was defence minister from 1973 to 1980 and Trade and Industry Minister from 1974 to 1980.  In 1980, he stepped down after having a coronary bypass operation.

He was a member of IOC from 1978 to 2004 and was an honorary member until his death.

Hamzah died on 4 September 2012 in Mantin, Negeri Sembilan. He was 88 years old. His body was buried in Makam Pahlawan near Masjid Negara, Kuala Lumpur.

Election results

Honours

Honours of Malaysia
  :
  Commander of the Order of the Defender of the Realm (PMN) – Tan Sri (1983)
  :
  Knight Grand Commander of the Order of the Crown of Selangor (SPMS) – Dato' Seri (1987)
  :
  Grand Knight of the Order of the Crown of Pahang (SIMP) – formerly Dato', now Dato' Indera
  Grand Knight of the Order of Sultan Ahmad Shah of Pahang (SSAP) – Dato' Sri
  :
  Grand Commander of the Order of Kinabalu (SPDK) – Datuk Seri Panglima (1974)
  :
  Companion of the Exalted Order of the Crown of Kedah (SMK) (1966)

References

External links
 The Malaysian Insider: Hamzah laid to rest at National Mosque

1924 births
2012 deaths
People from Pahang
Malaysian Muslims
Malaysian people of Malay descent
United Malays National Organisation politicians
Members of the Dewan Rakyat
Government ministers of Malaysia
Presidents of the Asian Football Confederation
Association football executives
Attorneys General of Malaysia
Commanders of the Order of the Defender of the Realm
Defence ministers of Malaysia
Justice ministers of Malaysia
20th-century Malaysian lawyers
Members of Gray's Inn
Knights Grand Commander of the Order of the Crown of Selangor